Stephano Lombardi (born 28 July 1976 in Pordenone) is an Italian footballer who played as a defender last for Modena F.C.

Career
Lombardi made his Serie A debut against Piacenza Calcio, on 13 September 1998. He won the Cup Winners Cup in 1998–99. Since then, he has played 20 more games in Serie A.

He also played 135 Serie B games, 22 in Serie C1, and 34 in Serie D. He retired in 2008.

External links
Profile at Lega-Calcio.it 

1976 births
Living people
People from Pordenone
Italian footballers
Treviso F.B.C. 1993 players
A.C. Milan players
Genoa C.F.C. players
S.S. Lazio players
S.S.C. Napoli players
Inter Milan players
A.C. Perugia Calcio players
A.C. Ancona players
Catania S.S.D. players
S.S. Arezzo players
Ascoli Calcio 1898 F.C. players
Modena F.C. players
Serie A players
Serie B players
Serie C players
Serie D players
Association football defenders
Footballers from Friuli Venezia Giulia